The climate of Mexico is very varied. The Tropic of Cancer effectively divides the country into temperate and tropical zones. Land that is north of the twenty-fourth parallel experiences lower temperatures during the winter months. South of the twenty-fourth parallel, temperatures are fairly consistent all year round and vary solely as a function of elevation. The north of the country usually receives less precipitation than the south.

By region
Temperatures here remain high throughout the year, with only a  difference between winter and summer median temperatures. Although low-lying areas north of the twenty-fourth parallel are hot and humid during the summer, they generally have lower yearly temperature averages (from ) because of more moderate conditions during the winter.

Towns and cities at this elevation south of the twenty-fourth parallel have relatively constant, pleasant temperatures throughout the year, whereas more northerly locations experience sizeable seasonal variations.

Rainfall varies widely both by location and season. Arid or semiarid conditions are encountered in the Baja California Peninsula, the northwestern state of Sonora, the northern altiplano, and also significant portions of the southern altiplano. Parts of the northern altiplano, highlands and high peaks in the Sierra Madres receive yearly snowfall. Citlaltépetl, Popocatépetl and, Iztaccíhuatl continue to support glaciers, the largest of which is the Gran Glaciar Norte.

Mexico has pronounced wet and dry seasons. Most of the country experiences a rainy season from June to mid-October and significantly less rain during the remainder of the year. February and July generally are the driest and wettest months, respectively. Coastal areas, especially those along the Gulf of Mexico, experience the largest amounts of rain in September. A portion of northwestern Baja California has a Mediterranean climate influenced by the California Current, with a rainy season that occurs in winter and coastal regions receiving considerable fog. Another area of the Mediterranean climate as a result of elevation occurs in the interior of Sonora.

Mexico lies squarely within the hurricane belt, and all regions of both coasts are susceptible to these storms from June through November. Hurricanes on the Pacific coast are often less violent than those affecting Mexico's eastern coastline. Several hurricanes per year strike the Caribbean and Gulf of Mexico coastline, however, and these storms bring high winds, heavy rain, extensive damage, and occasional loss of life. It then struck northeast Mexico, where flooding from the heavy rain killed dozens in the Monterrey area and caused extensive damage to livestock and vegetable crops.

Weather records
Temperature
 Heat: 52.5 °C (126.5 °F) in San Luis Río Colorado, Sonora on 15 June 1966
 Cold: −29 °C (−20.2 °F) in Los Lamentos, Chihuahua on 11 January 1962

Precipitation
Western Hemisphere record for 24-hour rainfall: 1633.98 mm (64.33 inches) over the time period of 12:30 UTC on 21 October 2005 to 12:30 UTC 22 October 2005 on Isla Mujeres, Quintana Roo during the passage of Hurricane Wilma. Also the record for the Northern Hemisphere.

Climate change

See also
 Climate change in Mexico
 Geography of Mexico

References

External links 
 Official site of the Servicio Meteorológico Nacional

 
Mexico